Gilbert is a city in St. Louis County, Minnesota, United States. The population was 1,799 at the 2010 census. State Highway 37 (MN 37) and State Highway 135 (MN 135) are two of the main routes in Gilbert. Gilbert is part of the Quad Cities, with Virginia, Eveleth, and Mountain Iron. The city is named for Giles Gilbert, who led the exploration of the McKinley mine property in the 1890s.

History
Gilbert was platted in 1907. A post office has been in operation at Gilbert since 1907.

Recreation
Gilbert is home to one of Minnesota's best-known OHV parks.

Gilbert is also the location of Lake Ore-be-gone, a former mining pit now used for fishing.

Geography

Demographics

2010 census
As of the census of 2010, there were 1,799 people, 835 households, and 486 families living in the city. The racial makeup of the city was 96.8% White, 0.2% African American, 1.0% Native American, 0.2% Asian, 0.1% Pacific Islander, 0.2% from other races, and 1.6% from two or more races. Hispanic or Latino of any race were 0.8% of the population.

There were 835 households, of which 25.4% had children under the age of 18 living with them, 43.8% were married couples living together, 9.8% had a female householder with no husband present, 4.6% had a male householder with no wife present, and 41.8% were non-families. 38.0% of all households were made up of individuals, and 17% had someone living alone who was 65 years of age or older. The average household size was 2.15 and the average family size was 2.82.

The median age in the city was 44.7 years. 21.8% of residents were under the age of 18; 4.7% were between the ages of 18 and 24; 23.8% were from 25 to 44; 31.8% were from 45 to 64; and 17.8% were 65 years of age or older. The gender makeup of the city was 48.6% male and 51.4% female.

2000 census
As of the 2000 census, there were 1,847 people, 842 households, and 495 families living in the city. The racial makeup of the city was 98.21% White, 0.22% African American, 0.49% Native American, 0.27% Asian, and 0.81% from two or more races. Hispanic or Latino of any race were 0.38% of the population. 18.9% were of Finnish, 13.9% Slovene, 13.8% German, 8.0% Norwegian, 7.3% Italian and 5.8% Swedish ancestry.

There were 842 households, out of which 24.2% had children under the age of 18 living with them, 46.2% were married couples living together, 8.3% had a female householder with no husband present, and 41.2% were non-families. 37.3% of all households were made up of individuals, and 19.7% had someone living alone who was 65 years of age or older.  The average household size was 2.19 and the average family size was 2.88.

In the city, the population was spread out, with 21.1% under the age of 18, 8.0% from 18 to 24, 25.6% from 25 to 44, 23.8% from 45 to 64, and 21.6% who were 65 years of age or older.  The median age was 42 years. For every 100 females, there were 97.5 males.  For every 100 females age 18 and over, there were 94.4 males.

The median income for a household in the city was $35,859, and the median income for a family was $44,931. Males had a median income of $40,625 versus $19,333 for females. The per capita income for the city was $17,407.  About 9.0% of families and 13.2% of the population were below the poverty line, including 17.3% of those under age 18 and 12.1% of those age 65 or over.

Notes
The town was once known as the red light district of the Iron Range, and planned a Whorehouse Days festival for two days in July 2005. The festival was canceled after the city council objected.
Gilbert is the birthplace of Bernie Kukar, a National Football League referee from 1984 to 2005.

References

External links
 City of Gilbert, MN – Official Website
 www.lakesnwoods.com – Gilbert Photo Gallery

Cities in Minnesota
Cities in St. Louis County, Minnesota
Mining communities in Minnesota
Populated places established in 1907
1907 establishments in Minnesota